Marine Light Attack Helicopter Squadron 369 (HMLA-369) is a United States Marine Corps helicopter squadron consisting of AH-1Z Viper attack helicopters and UH-1Y Venom utility helicopters. The squadron, also known as the "Gunfighters",  is based at Marine Corps Air Station Camp Pendleton, California and falls under the command of Marine Aircraft Group 39 (MAG-39) and the 3rd Marine Aircraft Wing (3rd MAW).

Mission
Support the Marine Air-Ground Task Force commander by providing offensive air support, utility support, armed escort and airborne supporting arms coordination, day or night under all weather conditions during expeditionary, joint or combined operations.

History

Vietnam War
HMA-369 was commissioned on April 1, 1972, at Marine Corps Air Station Futenma, Okinawa, assigned to Marine Aircraft Group 36, 1st Marine Aircraft Wing. Two months after being activated, the squadron was deployed to North Vietnam to participate in Operation MARHUK (Marine Hunter Killer). "Pistol Pete" as the squadron was then known, had the distinction of being the first attack helicopter squadron in Marine Corps history to conduct offensive air operations. The Marine Corps Aviation Association honored HMA-369 with their Helicopter Squadron of the Year Award in 1972. HMA-369 was also awarded a Navy Unit Citation for this period. The squadron redeployed to Okinawa in January 1973, but remained active in the conflict through Operation Eagle Pull and Operation Frequent Wind in 1975, flying numerous sorties supporting the evacuation of Saigon.

Post Vietnam
In April 1977, HMA-369 was disestablished on Okinawa and reestablished at Marine Corps Base Camp Pendleton, California as a member of Detachment Marine Aircraft Group 16, 3rd MAW.  In August 1983, HMA-369 had the distinction of being the first helicopter squadron of any service to participate in the United States Air Force Red Flag aviation combat exercise.

In October 1985, HMA-369 was in Hong Kong to support then Vice-President George H. W. Bush's trip to the People's Republic of China. On two separate occasions, the Gunfighters flew four UH-1Ns from Hong Kong across the Red Chinese border to the cities Guangzhou and Shenzhen. This historic trip marked the first time since 1949 that a tactical Marine squadron had entered Communist China's airspace.

Also during 1987, UH-1Ns were made a permanent part of the HMA-369 and on September 15, 1987 HMA-369 was officially re-designated as Marine Light Attack Helicopter Squadron 369 (HMLA-369). In October 1987, the majority of AH-1J pilots attended the AH-1W pilot's familiarization course in Dallas, Texas and on October 30, 1987, HMLA-369 received its first AH-1W.

Gulf War & the 1990s
In 1990, HMLA-369 was one of the squadrons chosen as the HMLA component of Marine Aircraft Group 70 (MAG-70) in support of Operation Desert Shield.  The Gunfighters advanced team arrived in Saudi Arabia on August 16, 1990, operating as the first Marine Light Attack Helicopter Squadron in theater.

During Desert Shield the Gunfighters were called to war. Throughout the war, the Gunfighters distinguished themselves both in the planning and execution phases of the air and ground wars. On 10 March 1991, the Gunfighters departed Saudi Arabia, returning to Camp Pendleton. In November, the Gunfighters received the MCAA Squadron of the Year Award. Numerous officers and crew were decorated for valor, most notable the Commanding Officer, Michael M. "Spot" Kurth, who was awarded the Navy Cross.

On November 28, 1992, HMLA-369 began planning for Operation Restore Hope, the international United Nations humanitarian relief effort in Somalia. On December 3, 1992, the Gunfighters were assigned as the force in readiness and by January 1, 1993, the entire squadron was deployed to Baledogle, Somalia, as the sole light attack helicopter squadron in theater operating under Marine Aircraft Group 16  HMLA -369 flew a variety of missions including Close In Fire Support, Command and Control, MEDEVAC, Escort, Visual and Photo Reconnaissance, Logistical Supply, VIP, and Non-Governmental Organization (NGO) support. HMLA-369 logged 1,098 flight hours during January.  The Gunfighters returned to Camp Pendleton in April 1993.

November 1993 saw the Gunfighters depart for Okinawa in support of the UDP deployment Program. Additionally, the Gunfighters provided detachments for the 11th and 31st Marine Expeditionary Units (Special Operations Capable) (MEU(SOC)). The Gunfighter 11th MEU(SOC) Detachment supported Operation Continue Hope and Operation Distant Runner, aiding in the evacuation of Americans from war torn Rwanda.

Global War on Terror

The Gunfighter's six AH-1Ws flew 22 days of continuous combat operations which included attached, detached and combined escort, close air support (CAS), forward air control (FAC(A)), and armed reconnaissance.

HMLA-369 arrived in Kuwait on April 13, 2003 and within three days began conducting combat operations in the skies of Iraq. In April 2003 the Gunfighters carried out over 300 combat missions into Iraq, from Ali Al Salem, Kuwait, providing combat support to Marines on the ground.  Amassing over 600 mishap-free hours, the Gunfighters directly supported the 1st Marine Expeditionary Force.  The Gunfighters flew over 1,300 mishap-free flight hours while performing offensive air and utility support missions. In the month of May alone, HMLA-369 flew 948.3 hours and completed 638 combat sorties.

Working mostly out of Blair Field, a forward operating base (FOB) in Al Kut, Iraq, the Gunfighters provided continuous air coverage in northeastern Iraq.  From June 27 to July 1, the Gunfighters flew air support for British allies in southeastern Iraq. The British ground forces requested close air support for their sweep of the towns of Al Amarah and Al Silah.  The month of July was short for Marine Light Attack Helicopter Squadron 369. The Gunfighters concluded flight operations in support of Operation Iraqi Freedom on July 12.

The Gunfighters finished up their second rotation in support of Operation Iraqi Freedom and are based at Forward Operating Base, Al Taqaddum, Iraq. As part of 2nd MAW (FWD), MAG-26(FWD).  During the course of the deployment, on November 2, 2005, an AH-1W Super Cobra from the squadron was shot down near Ramadi, killing the two Marines on board. In Jan 2007 SgtMaj Ledford is posted as the squadron SgtMaj. The unit deployed to Iraq again from April 2007 to November or 2007 and from November 2008 to May 2009. In June 2009 SgtMaj Berry is posted as the Squadron SgtMaj. The Gunfighters then deployed to Camp Leatherneck, Afghanistan from April 2010 to November 2010.  While in support of Operation Enduring Freedom (OEF), HMLA-369 had an AH-1W shot down, killing the two Marines on board. In December 2010, Lt.Col Clark assumed command of the Gunfighters.

In May 2011, SgtMaj Golden is posted as the Squadron SgtMaj and the Squadron deployed to Camp Leatherneck, Afghanistan from November 2011 to May 2012. In June 2012, Lt.Col Smith assumed command of the Gunfighters and prepared for deployment back to Afghanistan.  In May 2013 SgtMaj Buenafe is posted as the new Squadron SgtMaj for the Gunfighters. From November 2013 to June 2014, HMLA-369 deployed to Camp Bastion, Afghanistan and the last "Skid" Squadron from the West Coast.  The Gunfighters third and last deployment to Afghanistan also made history by being the first HMLA squadron to fly and operate from three different locations: Det-Alpha in Afghanistan, Det-Bravo at Camp Pendleton, California and a Det of 87 Marines and Sailors to Okinawa, Japan as part of the 31st MEU(SOC). In June 2014, LtCol Federico assumed command. In June 2015 SgtMaj Buckles is posted as the new SgtMaj. In December 2015, LtCol Marvel assumed command.  HMLA-369, continue to operate in support of the Global War on Terrorism and continue to be the premier Marine Light Attack Helicopter Squadron in the United States Marine Corps. In June 2017 LtCol Bidstrup assumed command.

See also

 United States Marine Corps Aviation
 List of active United States Marine Corps aircraft squadrons
 List of inactive United States Marine Corps aircraft squadrons

Citations

References
Bibliography

External links

 

LA369